

Architecture 
 Los Angeles Historic-Cultural Monument
 Historic-Cultural Monuments in Downtown Los Angeles
 Historic-Cultural Monuments in Hollywood
 Historic-Cultural Monuments in the Wilshire and Westlake areas
 Historic-Cultural Monuments in South Los Angeles
 Historic-Cultural Monuments on the East and Northeast Sides
 Historic-Cultural Monuments in the San Fernando Valley
 Historic-Cultural Monuments on the Westside
 Historic-Cultural Monuments in Silver Lake, Angelino Heights, and Echo Park
 Historic-Cultural Monuments in the Harbor area
 List of tallest buildings in Los Angeles
 National Register of Historic Places listings in Los Angeles

Education
 List of Los Angeles Unified School District schools
 List of Museums in Los Angeles
 List of schools in the Roman Catholic Archdiocese of Los Angeles
 Los Angeles Public Library branches

Geography
 Etymologies of place names in Los Angeles, California
 List of former municipalities in Los Angeles
 List of baseball parks in Los Angeles
 List of districts and neighborhoods of Los Angeles

Government
 List of elected officials in Los Angeles
 List of Los Angeles fire chiefs
 List of mayors of Los Angeles
 List of pre-statehood mayors of Los Angeles, California
 List of Los Angeles consulates
 List of Los Angeles Police Department Chiefs of Police

History
 Outline of the history of Los Angeles

Media and arts
 List of bands from Los Angeles
 List of films set in Los Angeles
 List of Hollywood novels
 List of local children's television series in Los Angeles
 List of Los Angeles Times publishers
 List of Los Angeles rappers
 List of songs about Los Angeles
 List of television shows set in Los Angeles
 List of Los Angeles television stations

People
 List of people from Los Angeles
 List of alumni of University High School
 List of Loyola High School (Los Angeles) people
 List of people from Los Feliz, Los Angeles
 List of University of California, Los Angeles people

Transportation
 List of airports in the Los Angeles area
 List of current Metro Local bus routes
 List of Los Angeles bike paths
 List of Los Angeles County Metro Rail stations
 Southern California freeways

Sports
Los Angeles Clippers-related lists
 List of Los Angeles Clippers broadcasters
 List of Los Angeles Clippers head coaches
 List of Los Angeles Clippers seasons
Los Angeles Dodgers-related lists
 Los Angeles Dodgers all-time roster
 List of Los Angeles Dodgers broadcasters
 List of Los Angeles Dodgers managers
 List of Los Angeles Dodgers minor league affiliates
 Los Angeles Dodgers minor league players
 List of Los Angeles Dodgers Opening Day starting lineups
 List of Los Angeles Dodgers Opening Day starting pitchers
 List of Los Angeles Dodgers owners and executives
 List of Los Angeles Dodgers seasons
Los Angeles Kings-related lists
 List of Los Angeles Kings broadcasters
 List of Los Angeles Kings draft picks
 List of Los Angeles Kings general managers
 List of Los Angeles Kings head coaches
 List of Los Angeles Kings players
 List of Los Angeles Kings seasons
Los Angeles Lakers-related lists
 Los Angeles Lakers all-time roster
 List of Los Angeles Lakers broadcasters
 List of Los Angeles Lakers first and second round draft picks
 List of Los Angeles Lakers head coaches
 List of Los Angeles Lakers seasons

Other
 List of criminal gangs in Los Angeles, California
 List of sites of interest in the Los Angeles area